The Hubbell House in Mantorville, Minnesota, United States, is one of the oldest working restaurants in the state of Minnesota.  It is a contributing property to the Mantorville Historic District, which is listed on the National Register of Historic Places.  The restaurant is located on Mantorville Avenue (Minnesota State Highway 57), which runs through Mantorville.  The building was originally constructed in 1854, but was rebuilt in 1856.

History 

The first structure deemed "The Hubbell House" was built in 1854, four years before Minnesota became a state in 1858, by John Hubbell and was a two-room log building.  It was known by mail carriers and stagecoach travelers as a rest stop along their path from East to West.  In 1856 it was reconstructed into a three-story building made of limestone from the local quarry.  After the new building was finished it became even more renowned as a stopping point on the path from the Mississippi River to Saint Peter.  At this time, The Hubbell House was popularly known as a saloon and a place to stop for weary travelers.

In the 1930s the building was given to Paul Pappas by his father-in-law and he envisioned a new life for The Hubbell House.  Pappas turned the once saloon into a fine dining restaurant and revived The Hubbell House to its former glory.  Paul died in 1996, but the restaurant continues to be owned and operated by the Pappas family.  After almost 160 years of business, The Hubbell House still provides delicious food with a civil-war era atmosphere to go along.  They display many historical artifacts which guests can gaze upon as they enjoy their meals.

Famous guests 

Over the years The Hubbell House has attracted several famous guests.  Starting back when it was first constructed, and continuing today, it has brought in many well-noted people who have stopped in for a bite to eat.  Some of those people are as follows:
 Senator Alexander Ramsey
 Ulysses S. Grant
 Brother Bishop Whipple
 Horace Greeley
 Ole Bull
 William Worrall Mayo
 Dwight D. Eisenhower
 Mickey Mantle
 Minnesota Vikings
 Iraqi President, Jalal Talabani

References

External links
Hubbell House Restaurant

1854 establishments in Minnesota Territory
Buildings and structures in Dodge County, Minnesota
Historic district contributing properties in Minnesota
Restaurants in Minnesota
Tourist attractions in Dodge County, Minnesota